John Ene Effe Okon (15 March 1969 – 15 March 2016) was a Nigerian football player.

International career
He was part of Nigeria's squad in the 1987 FIFA World Youth Championship and the African Nations Cup that finished third in 1992 Africa Cup of Nations.

Personal life

Death
Okon died after a short illness in March 2016. He  was Calabar Rovers' coach at the time.

Until his death, he was also coach of Eastside Sports Club, a Calabar-based social and non professional group which seeks to establish  and improve relationships among young professionals from various walks of life through sport.

References

External links 
 

Association football midfielders
Nigerian footballers
Nigeria under-20 international footballers
Nigeria international footballers
Calabar Rovers F.C. players
1992 African Cup of Nations players
1969 births
2016 deaths
BCC Lions F.C. players